Earnest Stanley O'Neal (born October 7, 1951) is an American business executive who was formerly chairman and chief executive of Merrill Lynch having served in numerous senior management positions at the company prior to this appointment.  O'Neal was criticized for his performance during his tenure as chief executive at Merrill Lynch, where he oversaw the deterioration of the firm's stability and capital position, which resulted in his ouster in September 2007, and the firm's eventual fire sale to Bank of America one year later.  Prior to his tenure as Chairman and CEO, Merrill Lynch had thrived as a stand-alone company since 1914.

In 2002, O'Neal was named the “Most Powerful Black Executive in America” by Fortune magazine.

O'Neal was a member of the board of directors of General Motors from 2001 through 2006. He also served on the board of Alcoa.

Early years 
Born into poverty in Roanoke, Alabama, Earnest Stanley O’Neal was the grandson of a former slave. He was the eldest child of Earnest O’Neal, a farmer, and Ann Scales, a domestic. In the first years of his life, O'Neal was surrounded by his extended family on his grandfather’s farm, "picking cotton and corn in his grandfather’s fields." He also sold and delivered newspapers.

College years 
Their family fortunes improved when Stanley’s father landed a job at the General Motors (GM) factory. O'Neal's father moved his family from Wedowee, Alabama, to Atlanta, where he worked on a General Motors assembly line. Stan O'Neal also worked briefly on GM's assembly line as a teenager under a work-study program offered by the General Motors Institute (later known as Kettering University), where he gained a degree in industrial administration in 1974. GM later provided O'Neal a scholarship to attend Harvard Business School, where he attained his MBA in 1978 and later rejoined GM as a Treasury Analyst.

Career 
O'Neal initially worked as an analyst for General Motors; within two years he was a director in the treasury division.

Merrill Lynch
In 1986, O'Neal joined Merrill Lynch and, by the early 1990s, he was running Merrill's leveraged finance division. After spells as global head of capital markets and co-head of the corporate and institutional client group, he spent two years as CFO from 1998 to 2000. In 2000, he was appointed president of the U.S. Private Client Group, the first executive of the division that oversees Merrill's brokerage who had not himself been a broker. O'Neal led massive layoffs within the division.

O'Neal became president of the firm in 2001 in a palace intrigue that eventually led to the early ouster of his predecessor and one-time mentor David Komansky. By 2003, he was CEO and chairman. O'Neal was one of the first African Americans to hold such a high position on Wall Street. He earned $48 million in 2006 and $46 million in 2007. One of his first moves as CEO was to dismiss his number two executive, executive vice chairman Thomas H. Patrick, Sr., and afterward Arshad R. Zakaria, who headed institutional banking and securities. Originally there had been a deal where Patrick and Arshad R. Zakaria would support O'Neal's promotion to CEO, and in return Zakaria would be appointed president. Once O'Neal became CEO, however, he refused to continue this "backroom dealing".

As CEO, O'Neal attempted to get rid of the 'Mother Merrill' culture of job security, arguing that it promoted cronyism instead of merit. He also wanted to transform Merrill into a trading powerhouse, and to beat Goldman Sachs at its own game. After the departure of Chris Ricciardi in 2006, O'Neal hired Osman Semerci as Global Head of Fixed Income, on the advice of trading and investment banking head Dow Kim and COO Ahmass Fakahany. Semerci continued the push into the subprime mortgage-backed CDO market, and grew the firm's position from $5-$6 billion worth of exposure to $55 billion in under one year, while firing respected trader Jeff Kronthal and demoting risk manager John Breit, both of whom had warned against too much exposure to CDOs. Merrill was one of the top CDO underwriters of the boom era, a plan that initially brought huge bonuses to Merrill until the markets turned. According to the then-president of Merrill, Greg Fleming, the dismissal of Kronthal in July 2006 was the day Merrill Lynch’s fate was sealed, otherwise the firm may have "avoided the subprime problems that would soon bring Wall Street to its knees. After that date, Merrill was doomed to make the same mistakes as its competitors."

O'Neal was regarded as out of touch as the market changed and Merrill steered towards trouble, as he had "become isolated from his own firm. He had no idea that key risk managers had been pushed aside or that the people he had put in important positions were out of their depth". O'Neal was described as a manager who "had never been the kind of C.E.O. who walked the trading floor. By 2006, he was so divorced from his own firm that he failed to appreciate the utter lunacy of Semerci’s desire to clean house. Did he really think Semerci could get rid of Merrill’s most experienced mortgage traders and not harm the mortgage desk? Sadly, it seems that O’Neal didn’t think about it at all." "At the same time Goldman executives were canceling vacations to deal with the burgeoning subprime crisis, O’Neal was often on the golf course, playing round after round by himself", in fact six months before Bear Stearns nearly collapsed Merrill added tens of billions of risky securities to its balance sheet while Goldman moved to reduce exposure.

During August and September 2007, as the subprime mortgage crisis swept through the global financial market, Merrill Lynch announced losses of $8 billion.  O'Neal finally realized the huge exposure that Merrill had to subprime mortgage-backed CDOs, and that the firm would have to be sold in order to survive.  As the crisis worsened, O'Neal approached Bank of America and Wachovia Bank about a possible merger, without first obtaining the approval of Merrill's Board of Directors, which led to his ouster. On October 30, 2007 O'Neal resigned as CEO. He left with a severance package including Merrill stock and options worth $161.5 million on top of the $91.4 million in total compensation he earned in 2006.

Post-resignation
The board hired John Thain from NYSE Euronext to replace O'Neal as chairman and CEO, believing that Thain could save the business, however the markets and the firm continued to deteriorate in 2008. Thain was forced to merge Merrill with Bank of America in September 2008, the weekend before Lehman Brothers filed for bankruptcy.

On January 18, 2008, O'Neal was named to the board of directors of Alcoa.

O'Neal is said to have an "abrasive" personality.  When Thain arrived at Merrill he scrapped O'Neal's practice of having the security guards always hold an entire elevator bank open exclusively for him.

CNBC includes O'Neal in their list of "Worst American CEOs of All Time". The New York Times Magazine on April 18, 2010 described O'Neal as one of the "feckless dolts" who helped precipitate the financial crisis of 2007. During the final hearings prior to the firm's merger with Bank of America, numerous people – including a founder's son, Win Smith – laid the blame on O'Neal for the firm's downfall and loss of independence.

Financial Crisis Inquiry Commission 
On March 11 of 2016, a release of documents by the National Archives revealed that the Financial Crisis Inquiry Commission had recommended that O'Neal be prosecuted for multiple crimes in connection with his activities as CEO of Merrill Lynch during the lead up to the sub-prime crisis. No formal legal action has resulted, however.

References

External links
"Blundering Herd" by Bethany McLean and Joe Nocera, Nov 2010 Vanity Fair pg 179
 John Cassidy, "Subprime Suspect," The New Yorker, March 31, 2008 (detailed online abstract)
 Harvard Business School Bulletin profile
 Merrill's mess - 2007 BBC article that was subsequently hidden from Google search results

Living people
People from Roanoke, Alabama
African-American business executives
American business executives
American chief executives of financial services companies
General Motors former executives
Harvard Business School alumni
Kettering University alumni
Merrill (company) people
1951 births
People from New York (state)
21st-century African-American people
20th-century African-American people